Juan José Falcón Sanabria (Las Palmas 1936) is a Spanish conductor and composer.

Falcón Sanabria conducts the Coral Polifónica de Las Palmas and Orquesta Filarmónica de Gran Canaria.

Own works, editions
 Opera La hija del cielo (2007).
 Sanabria Atlántica; Elan; Sinfonia Urbana Col Legno.

As conductor of other composers
 Polifonía Española del S. XX. vol. I Gofio

References

1936 births
Living people
Spanish composers
Spanish male composers